Katharina Dröge (born 16 September 1984) is a German economist and politician of Alliance 90/The Greens who has been serving as co-chair of the Green Party’s parliamentary group in the Bundestag since 2021, alongside Britta Haßelmann. She previously served as one of the group’s managers from 2018 to 2021. She has been a member of the Bundestag since 2013.

Education and early career
On a scholarship of the German Academic Scholarship Foundation, Dröge studied economics at the University of Cologne from 2004 to 2010.

From 2010 until 2013, Dröge worked at the State Ministry of Climate Change, Environment, Agriculture and Consumer Protection of North Rhine-Westphalia.

Political career
Dröge has been a member of the German Bundestag since the 2013 elections, representing Cologne’s Ehrenfeld, Nippes, and Chorweiler districts. In parliament, she has since been serving on the Committee on Economic Affairs and Energy. She is also her parliamentary group's spokesperson on competition policy. In addition to her committee assignments, she is a member of the German-British Parliamentary Friendship Group.

In the negotiations to form a so-called traffic light coalition of the Social Democrats (SPD), the Green Party and the FDP following the 2021 federal elections, Dröge led her party's delegation in the working group on labor policy; her co-chairs from the other parties were Hubertus Heil and Johannes Vogel.

Other activities

Regulatory agencies
 Federal Network Agency for Electricity, Gas, Telecommunications, Post and Railway (BNetzA), Alternate Member of the Advisory Board (since 2014)

Non-profit organizations
 Heinrich Böll Foundation, Member of the General Assembly
 Amnesty International, Member
 Terre des Femmes, Member
 German Foundation for World Population (DSW), Member of the Parliamentary Advisory Board (since 2021)

Political positions
Within the Green Party, Dröge is considered to be part of its left wing.

References

1984 births
Living people
21st-century German women politicians
Members of the Bundestag for North Rhine-Westphalia
University of Cologne alumni
People from Münster
Members of the Bundestag 2021–2025
Members of the Bundestag 2017–2021
Members of the Bundestag 2013–2017
Members of the Bundestag for Alliance 90/The Greens